Mutea Iringo is a Kenyan politician who is a former Principal Secretary, Ministry of Interior and Coordination of National Government, to the Cabinet of Kenya.

References

Living people
Year of birth missing (living people)
Kenyan politicians
Place of birth missing (living people)
Interior ministers of Kenya